The Ninth Age: Fantasy Battles (commonly abbreviated to The 9th Age or T9A) is a tabletop miniature wargame created and updated since 2015 by the non-profit association The Ninth Age. It simulates mass battles between two high fantasy armies represented by 28 mm scale models on square bases in rank and file formations.

Development 
After the release of the End Times expansions for the 8th edition of Warhammer Fantasy Battle in 2014–2015, Games Workshop discontinued both its game system and its lore. It was then replaced in its catalog by Warhammer Age of Sigmar, which left some tabletop wargamers estranged.

In June 2015, Lagge and fjugin, two prominent staff members of the Swedish Comp System (a fan-made expansion for competitive play of Warhammer), initiated a separate project called The Ninth Age and aimed at providing a new and balanced game system. The main target audience are tabletop players interested in a rank and file army game rather than skirmish games such as Age of Sigmar. A primary goal of the project has been to allow former players of Warhammer to use their model collections in games of The Ninth Age.

The project attracted the attention of wargamers and tournaments organizers in Europe and North America such as the European Tabletop Championship 2017 edition in  Salamanca, Spain, and the Buckeye Battles in Columbus, Ohio. Independent miniature manufacturers, including Avatars of War, Titan Forge and Tabletop Miniatures Solutions, have launched lines of models dedicated to or compatible with the rules of The Ninth Age. The game has also become supported by BattleScribe, Quartermaster and Magnetic – Movementtray.com.

To ease the introduction of new players to the game, the authors released the Quick Starter edition in April 2017. It represents a faster and easier version of the core game, played on a smaller scale. The 72 page rulebook includes elementary lists for all 16 factions, an introduction to the world of the Ninth Age and unique artwork.

The second edition of the ruleset was released in December 2018 after a year of beta testing and is intended to stay unchanged for several years during which the team will focus on the production of new army books.

Army books 
Each army book, free to download from the game's website, details the composition and rules of the military of a specific faction. The team is gradually converting slim books, focused solely on the rules, into "Legendary" books with artwork and lore background.

Most of the lore and units of the Ninth Age are inspired by Historical fantasy, mythologies, fairy tales, human History and natural history, for instance the Beast Herds' Jabberwock, the Vampire Covenant's Varkolak and the Saurian Ancients' Taurosaur.

Core armies 
The game fully supports 16 armies.

After the release of the full books of the Warriors of the Dark Gods and the Daemon Legions in 2018, followed by the beta release of the Infernal Dwarves in 2019, the team has announced that the next armies to be treated with a major overhaul will be the Dread Elves, the Vermin Swarm and the Kingdom of Equitaine.

Other armies 
In addition to the 16 core armies, the game includes a smaller number of armies which are not designed for competitive play.

In parallel to the official content, homebrew army books are also developed and shared by community members on the forum of the game.

The 9th Scroll 
The 9th Scroll is a bi-monthly online magazine available for free on the game's website, featuring interviews, do-it-yourself tutorials, homebrew rules, armies showcases and other articles from the community and the T9A staff. Issue 4 (July 2017) has over 75.000 downloads.

Relation to Games Workshop's Warhammer: Fantasy Battles 

Similarities: The Ninth Age: Fantasy Battles invention was triggered by the discontinuation of WHFB after the End Times campaign. A main goal of the project was to create a game that continues on the same level of scale (i.e. army size, model count, game duration) and playstyle. The playstyle was specifically important as Games Workshop follow-up product "Age of Sigmar" changed in this regard from a "Rank and File" system to a "Skirmish" system. Additional goals were to allow former WHFB players to carry over their collections to The Ninth Age without greater modifications. This directly resulted in the same initial number of playable armies.

Differences: Opposed to WHFB, T9A is a model-agnostic system. There are no specific T9A models to represent each unit entry. This allows manufacturers to create a wide range of compatible models, which can look quite differently. This also means, that there is no "reference model" for an entry in the respective army books. Another important goal is set internal and external balance of army books to increase the playability of all entries in the respective army books. T9A does not aim to release new rules or create an expanding set of options in the playable armies. As a direct result of balancing considerations, the army categorizations are different for each army. Where WHFB used a fix separation of core/special/rare entries, T9A books categorize armies on the roles of units, e.g. shooting units, ambushing units, highly-mobile units may have their own category. Based on the first two complete revisions of army books (Warriors of the Dark Gods and Daemon Legions), the difference in army organisations and unit entries will become even more distinct over time, as the so-called Legendary Army Books (LABs) are developed and finished.

External links 
 
 
 https://opinion.cooperativa.cl/opinion/sociedad/novena-era/2020-07-03/105557.html

Notes 

Miniature wargames
Tabletop games
Wargame rule sets
Fantasy games
Wargames introduced in the 2010s